The Fénix Awards were an annual ceremony of awards celebrated in Mexico City and presented by the association Cinema23 recognising excellence in the Ibero-American film industry. They were delivered from 2014 to 2018.

History 

Presented by the association Cinema23 (created in turn in 2012), the awards were created in 2014 to honor works in the Ibero-American film industry. The first ceremony took place in October 2014 in Mexico City, only some months after the celebration of the 1st Platino Awards (with the same Ibero-American scope) in Panama City.

The statuette was designed by Brazilian artist Artur Lescher.

Editions 
  (Teatro de la Ciudad, 30 October 2014)
  (Teatro de la Ciudad Esperanza Iris, 25 November 2015)
  (Teatro de la Ciudad Esperanza Iris, 7 December 2016)
  (6 December 2017)
 5th Fénix Awards (Teatro de la Ciudad Esperanza Iris, 7 November 2018)

See also 
 Platino Awards

References 
Citations

Bigliography